Leontynów  is a village in the administrative district of Gmina Młodzieszyn, within Sochaczew County, Masovian Voivodeship, in east-central Poland.

External links
 Jewish Community in Leontynów on Virtual Shtetl

References

Villages in Sochaczew County